Spyros Peristeris (1900 – 15 March 1966) was a Greek rebetiko composer and a skillful mandolin and bouzouki player.

Biography

Peristeris was born in Smyrna, Ottoman Empire. His parents were Aristides, a famous musician who originated from Athens, and Despina (née Bekou) who was a Corsican Greek and an Italian citizen. Peristeris learned to play the mandolin from a young age. Around 1914, his family moved to Constantinople where Peristeris graduated from the Italian school, managing to learn Italian and German. He also completed his music studies and was already an acclaimed musician at the age of 18. After the death of his father in 1918, he moved back to Smyrna and substituted him in the direction of the famous Smyrna Estudiantina (also known as ta Politakia).

After the destruction of Smyrna in 1922, Peristeris moved to Athens, where he soon learned to play the bouzouki and became known as a composer and lyricist. Peristeris could play all fingerboard string instruments as well as the piano, accordion, cello and double bass. From the early 1930s, he worked as local repertory manager and orchestra leader for several recording companies (namely Grammophone, Columbia, His Master's Voice, Odeon, Parlophone) in Greece. From these posts, he strongly influenced the direction of rebetiko music. For instance, he was pivotal in persuading Markos Vamvakaris to record his songs sung with his own voice. Parallel to his managerial activities, Peristeris continued to compose and record songs of his own.

Notes

External links
Σπύρος Περιστέρης from rebetiko wiki

1900 births
1966 deaths
Greek composers
Rebetiko musicians
Greek bouzouki players
Greek oud players
Greek mandolin players
Greek pianists
Greek songwriters
Smyrniote Greeks
Art directors
20th-century pianists
Emigrants from the Ottoman Empire to Greece
Musicians from İzmir